Tymnessus or Tymnessos was a town of ancient Caria, near the frontier with Lycia.

Its site is unlocated.

References

Populated places in ancient Caria
Former populated places in Turkey
Lost ancient cities and towns